The 1935 World Series was the championship series in Major League Baseball for the 1935 season. The 32nd edition of the World Series, it matched the Detroit Tigers and the Chicago Cubs.

The Tigers won despite losing the services of first baseman Hank Greenberg.  In Game 2, Greenberg collided with Cubs catcher Gabby Hartnett and broke his wrist, sidelining him for the rest of the Series.  

The Cubs had won 21 consecutive games in September (still a record ), eventually taking the National League pennant by four games over the defending World Series champions, the St. Louis Cardinals.

In Game 6, Tommy Bridges pitched a complete-game victory to win the Series for Detroit. With the score tied 3–3 in the top of the ninth inning, Bridges gave up a leadoff triple to Stan Hack, but retired the next three batters without the runner on third scoring.  In the bottom of the ninth, Goose Goslin drove in the winning run with two outs. After the game, manager Mickey Cochrane said the following of Bridges' gutsy performance: "A hundred and fifty pounds of courage. If there ever is a payoff on courage this little 150-pound pitcher is the greatest World Series hero."

In addition to Bridges, the Tigers had a hitting hero. Right fielder Pete Fox accumulated ten hits and an average of .385 for the Series. Fox hit safely in all six games.

Detroit owner Frank Navin, then 64 years old, had been running the organization for 30 years and had seen four of his teams win American League pennants, only to lose four World Series. Six weeks after the Tigers finally won the World Series in October 1935, Navin suffered a heart attack while riding a horse and died.

Summary

Matchups

Game 1

A pitching duel between Lon Warneke and Schoolboy Rowe, both of whom went the distance, was decided by its leadoff batter, Augie Galan, doubling, and scoring on an error by Rowe that allowed Billy Herman to reach and eventually score on a Gabby Hartnett single. Frank Demaree added a homer in the ninth inning for the visiting Cubs.

Game 2

In the bottom of the first, Jo-Jo White hit a leadoff single and scored on a double by Mickey Cochrane, who scored on Charlie Gehringer's single before Hank Greenberg's two-run home run knocked Cubs' starter Charlie Root out of the game. In the fourth, Roy Henshaw got two outs before letting the Tigers load the bases on a single, hit-by-pitch and walk. A wild pitch scored a run, then after a walk reloaded the bases, Gehringer's two-run single made it 7–0 Tigers. The Cubs got on the board in the fifth when Phil Cavarretta reached first on an error, moved to second on a groundout and scored on Billy Jurges's single. The Cubs got two more runs in the seventh on Billy Herman's single with runners on second and third, but the Tigers added a run in the bottom half on Pete Fox's RBI single off of Fabian Kowalik. Tommy Bridges pitched a complete game as the Tigers' 8–3 tied the series heading to Chicago.

Game 3

In Game 3, Frank Demaree's leadoff home run in the second off of Elden Auker put Chicago on the board. A one-out single and subsequent error put runners on first and third before Bill Lee's ground out made it 2–0 Cubs. They added a run in the fifth when Billy Jurges drew a leadoff walk, moved to second on a sacrifice bunt and scored on Augie Galan's single. The Tigers got on the board in the sixth when Goose Goslin singled off of Lee and scored on Pete Fox's triple. In the eighth, after a walk and double, Goslin's two-run single tied the game and knocked Lee out. Reliever Lon Warneke allowed two singles, the second of which to Billy Rogell scoring a run, then Fox stole home to make it 5–3 Tigers. Detroit brought back Game 1 starter Schoolboy Rowe in relief. He allowed three straight one-out singles in the ninth, the last of which to Ken O'Dea, before Augie Galan's sacrifice fly sent the game into extra innings, but Rowe nailed down the victory after Jo-Jo White's RBI single scored the winning run off of Larry French in the 11th.  This game remarkably featured four ejections, two from each team.  The Tigers lost Woody English and coach Del Baker.  The Cubs lost Tuck Stainback and manager Charlie Grimm.  Neither English nor Stainback were in the game.

Game 4

Alvin "General" Crowder did it all for Detroit, pitching a complete-game five-hitter, allowing only one run on Gabby Hartnett's home run in the second, singling in the third and scoring his team's first run on Charlie Gehringer's RBI double, and getting Flea Clifton home as the go-ahead run with a groundout in the sixth off of Tex Carleton aided by two errors. Chicago threatened against Crowder with a pair of one-out hits in the ninth, but Stan Hack grounded into a game-ending 6-4-3 double play.

Game 5

Staving off elimination, the Cubs got a two-run home run from Chuck Klein after a leadoff triple in the second. They added another run in the seventh on Billy Herman's RBI double off of Schoolboy Rowe. They replaced Lon Warneke after six innings with right-hander Bill Lee, who gave up Detroit's only run in the ninth on three consecutive singles (the last of which to Pete Fox before settling down to retire the final three batters.

This was the first of three World Series games that the Cubs have won in Wrigley Field (where they had previously lost 6 Series games). The other wins were Game 6 in 1945, and Game 5 in 2016.

Game 6

In Game 6, Pete Fox's RBI double off of Larry French put the Tigers on the board. Billy Herman's RBI single tied the game in the third off of Tommy Bridges, who put the Tigers back in front in the fourth with an RBI groundout with two on, but Herman's two-run home run in the fifth put the Cubs ahead 3–2. The Tigers tied the game in the sixth when Billy Rogell doubled with two outs and scored on Marv Owen's single. In the ninth, Mickey Cochrane singled and moved to second on a groundout before Goose Goslin's walk-off single won it in front of Detroit's home fans, pitcher Tommy Bridges getting his second win of the Series. Stan Hack tripled to lead off the top of the 9th for the Cubs, but was left stranded at third.

Composite line score
1935 World Series (4–2): Detroit Tigers (A.L.) over Chicago Cubs (N.L.)

Detroit: "City of Champions"

When the Detroit Tigers won the 1935 World Series, the city of Detroit was mired in the Great Depression, which had hit the city and its industries particularly hard.  However, with the success of the Tigers and other Detroit teams and athletes in 1935/36, Detroit's luck appeared to be changing, as the city was dubbed the "City of Champions." The Lions continued Detroit's winning ways by capturing the 1935 NFL Championship Game, followed by the Detroit Red Wings winning the 1935–36 Stanley Cup championship. With the Stanley Cup win, the city had seen three major league championships in less than a year.  Detroit's "champions" included Detroit's "Brown Bomber", Joe Louis, the heavyweight boxing champion; native Detroiter Gar Wood who was the champion of unlimited powerboat racing and the first man to go 100 miles per hour on water; and Eddie "the Midnight Express" Tolan, a black Detroiter who won gold medals in the 100- and 200-meter races at the 1932 Summer Olympics.

Notes

References

External links

 Detroit Tigers History

World Series
World Series
Detroit Tigers postseason
Chicago Cubs postseason
World Series
World Series
1930s in Chicago
1935 in Detroit
October 1935 sports events
Baseball competitions in Detroit
Baseball competitions in Chicago